This Gigantic Robot Kills is the fourth album by nerdcore musician MC Lars.  Lars has stated that he worked with "Weird Al" Yankovic, the Rondo Brothers, Nick Rowe and Mike Kennedy of Bloodsimple, James Bourne of Busted, Daniel Dart of Time Again, Donal Finn of Flash Bastard, Pierre Bouvier of Simple Plan, MC Bat Commander of The Aquabats, Suburban Legends, Worm Quartet, Gabriel Saporta of Cobra Starship, Brett Anderson of The Donnas, MC Frontalot, Amie Miriello of Dirtie Blonde, Jesse Dangerously, Linus Dotson of Size 14, Parry Gripp of Nerf Herder, Jonathan Coulton, Aesias Finale, Sebastian Reynolds, Brendan B. Brown of Wheatus, and classical musician Walt Ribeiro on songs for the new album.

The track "Hey There Ophelia" is based on "Screamager" by Northern Irish band Therapy?. "Screamager" appears on the Shortsharpshock E.P., and the album, Troublegum.

The track "White Kids Aren't Hyphy" is loosely based on the song "I Wish" by Skee-Lo.

The title of the album is a tribute to Wesley Willis, who appeared at the end of the MC Lars song "Yes, I Am an Alien" and the beginning of the song "True Player for Real". In both songs, Wesley says that he will write a song about Lars on his new album, called "This Gigantic Robot Kills". Wesley died shortly after.

Tracks
 "Where Ya Been Lars?"
 "True Player for Real" (featuring "Weird Al" Yankovic on accordion & Wheatus)
 "Hipster Girl"
 "It's Not Easy (Being Green)" (featuring Pierre Bouvier of Simple Plan)
 "This Gigantic Robot Kills" (featuring Suburban Legends and the MC Bat Commander)
 "No Logo" (featuring Jesse Dangerously)
 "35 Laurel Drive"
 "Twenty-Three" (featuring Amie Miriello from Dirtie Blonde)
 "Guitar Hero Hero (Beating Guitar Hero Doesn't Make You Slash)" (featuring Parry Gripp and Paul Gilbert)
 "O.G. Original Gamer" (featuring MC Frontalot and Jonathan Coulton)
 "We Have Arrived" (featuring K.Flay, YTCracker and the Former Fat Boys)
 "White Kids Aren't Hyphy"
 "Hey There Ophelia" (featuring Gabe Saporta of Cobra Starship and Brett Anderson of The Donnas, as Ophelia)
 "(Lord It's Hard to Be Happy When You're Not) Using the Metric System" (Atom & His Package cover) (featuring Worm Quartet)

References

External links
Official Site
MC Lars myspace
Official Album site

2009 albums
MC Lars albums